Adaviyar (also spelt as Ataviyar) is a Tamil speaking Hindu caste whose traditionally weavers from Thanjavur and Tirunelveli districts.

See also 
Kaikolar
Saliya
Padmasali
Devanga

References 

Indian castes
Social groups of Tamil Nadu
Weaving communities of South Asia